Russell Miller (born  1938) is a British journalist and author of fifteen books, including biographies of Hugh Hefner, J. Paul Getty and L. Ron Hubbard.

While under contract to The Sunday Times Magazine he won four press awards and was voted Writer of the Year by the Society of British Magazine Editors. His book Magnum: Fifty Years at the Front Line of History: The Story of the Legendary Photo Agency (1999) on Magnum Photos, was described by John Simpson as "the best book on photo-journalism I have ever read". His oral histories of D-Day, Nothing Less Than Victory (1993), and the SOE, Behind The Lines (2002) were widely acclaimed, both in Britain and in the United States.

Life and work

Miller was born in east London and began his career in journalism at the age of sixteen.

In the early 1980s, Miller decided to write a biographical trilogy on the subjects of sex, money, and religion. The books that followed were Bunny (on Hugh Hefner, published in 1984), The House of Getty (on J. Paul Getty, 1985), and Bare-faced Messiah: The True Story of L. Ron Hubbard (on L. Ron Hubbard, 1987).

L. Ron Hubbard biography

In the 1980s Miller spent two years researching Bare-faced Messiah, a posthumous biography of the science-fiction author who had founded Scientology. The book challenges the official account of Hubbard's life and work promoted by the Church of Scientology and it was serialised in The Sunday Times.

While researching the book in the United States, Miller was spied upon. His friends and business associates also received visits from Scientologists and private detectives. Attempts were made to frame him for the murder of a London private detective, the murder of American singer Dean Reed in East Berlin and a fire in an aircraft factory. Senior executives at publishers Michael Joseph, and at The Sunday Times, which serialised the book, received threatening phone calls and also a visit from private investigator Eugene Ingram, who worked for the Church. Another private investigator, Jarl Grieve Einar Cynewulf, told The Sunday Times journalists that he had been offered "large sums of money" to find a link between Miller and the Central Intelligence Agency (CIA).

Bibliography
 The Resistance (1979) 
 The East Indiamen (1980)
 The Commandos by Russell Miller & The Editors of Time-Life Books
 Continents in Collision (1983)
 The Soviet Air Force (1983)
 Bunny (1984), a biography of Hugh Hefner.
 The House of Getty (1985), a biography of J. Paul Getty.
 Bare-faced Messiah (1987), a biography of L. Ron Hubbard.
 Body and Soul: How to Succeed in Business and Change the World, with Anita Roddick (1992)
 Nothing Less Than Victory: An Oral History of D-Day (1993)
 Ten Days in May: The People's Story of VE Day (1995)
 Magnum: Fifty Years at the Front Line of History: The Story of the Legendary Photo Agency (1999)
 Behind The Lines: The Oral History of Special Operations in World War II (2002)
 Codename Tricycle: The True Story of the Second World War's most extraordinary Double Agent (2004), a biography of Dušan Popov.
 The Adventures of Arthur Conan Doyle: A Biography (2008)
 Uncle Bill: the Authorised Biography of Field Marshal Sir William Slim of Burma (2013)
 Boom: The Life of Viscount Trenchard, Father of the Royal Air Force (2016)

Awards
Colour Magazine Writer of the Year, British Press Awards 1990
Four Press Awards, The Sunday Times Magazine
Writer of the Year, British Society of Magazine Editors

Television appearances
In his capacity as Hubbard's biographer, Miller appeared in three British television documentaries:
 Facing South: The Cult Business broadcast on TVS (southern England regional TV), November 1987
 The Big Story: Inside the Cult made by Carlton TV and broadcast on ITV, 13 July 1995
 Scientology and Me broadcast on BBC One,  14 May 2007

References

External links 
Bare-Faced Messiah by Miller (full text) – PDF version and HTML version
See You In Court by Miller (from Punch, February 1988)

1930s births
Living people
Year of birth uncertain
British male journalists
British non-fiction writers
Critics of Scientology